Macalla fasciculata is a species of snout moth in the genus Macalla. It was described by George Hampson in 1906. It is found in South Africa.

References

Endemic moths of South Africa
Moths described in 1906
Epipaschiinae